Tinplate consists of sheets of steel coated with a thin layer of tin to impede rusting. Before the advent of cheap milled steel, the backing metal was wrought iron. While once more widely used, the primary use of tinplate now is the manufacture of tin cans. 
 
Tinplate is made by rolling the steel (or formerly iron) in a rolling mill, removing any mill scale  by pickling it in acid and then coating it with a thin layer of tin. Plates were once produced individually (or in small groups) in what became known as a pack mill. In the late 1920s pack mills began to be replaced by strip mills which produced larger quantities more economically.

Formerly, tinplate was used for cheap pots, pans and other holloware.  This kind of holloware was also known as tinware and the people who made it were tinplate workers.

For many purposes, tinplate has been replaced by galvanised (zinc-coated or tinned) vessels, though not for cooking as zinc is poisonous.  The zinc layer prevents the iron from rusting through sacrificial protection with the zinc oxidizing instead of the iron, whereas tin will only protect the iron if the tin-surface remains unbroken.

History of production processes and markets
The practice of tin mining likely began around 3000 B.C. in Western Asia, British Isles and Europe. Tin was an essential ingredient of bronze production there, during the Bronze Age.
The practice of tinning ironware to protect it against rust is an ancient one. This may have been the work of the whitesmith. This was done after the article was fabricated, whereas tinplate was tinned before fabrication. Tinplate was apparently produced in the 1620s at a mill of (or under the patronage of) the Earl of Southampton, but it is not clear how long this continued.

The first production of tinplate was probably in Bohemia, from where the trade spread to Saxony, and was well-established there by the 1660s. Andrew Yarranton and Ambrose Crowley (a Stourbridge blacksmith and father of the more famous Sir Ambrose) visited Dresden in 1667 and found out how it was made. In doing so, they were sponsored by various local ironmasters and people connected with the project to make the river Stour navigable. In Saxony, the plates were forged, but when they conducted experiments on their return to England, they tried rolling the iron. This led to the ironmasters Philip Foley and Joshua Newborough (two of the sponsors) in 1670 erecting a new mill, Wolverley Lower Mill (or forge) in Worcestershire. This contained three shops, one being a slitting mill (which would serve as a rolling mill), and the others were forges. In 1678 one of these was making frying pans and the other drawing out blooms made in finery forges elsewhere. It is likely that the intention was to roll the plates and then finish them under a hammer, but the plan was frustrated by one William Chamberlaine renewing a patent granted to him and Dud Dudley in 1662.

The slitter at Wolverley was Thomas Cooke. Another Thomas Cooke, perhaps his son, moved to Pontypool and worked there for John Hanbury. He had a slitting mill there and was also producing iron plates called 'Pontpoole plates'. Edward Lhuyd reported the existence of this mill in 1697. This has been claimed as a tinplate works, but it was almost certainly only producing (untinned) blackplate.

Tinplate first begins to appear in the Gloucester Port Books (which record trade passing through Gloucester), mostly from ports in the Bristol Channel in 1725. The tinplate was shipped from Newport, Monmouthshire. This immediately follows the first appearance (in French) of Reamur's Principes de l'art de fer-blanc, and prior to a report of it being published in England.

Further mills followed a few years later, initially in many iron-making regions in England and Wales, but later mainly in south Wales, most notably the Melingriffith Tin Plate Works,  Whitchurch, Cardiff, which was founded some time before 1750. In 1805, 80,000 boxes were made and 50,000 exported. The industry continued to grow until 1891. One of the greatest markets was the United States of America, but that market was cut off in 1891, when the McKinley tariff was enacted there. This caused a great retrenchment in the British industry and the emigration to America of many of those who could no longer be employed in the surviving tinplate works.

Despite this blow, the industry continued, but on a smaller scale. Nevertheless, there were still 518 mills in operation in 1937, including 224 belonging to Richard Thomas & Co. However, the traditional 'pack mill' had been overtaken by the improved 'strip mill', of which the first in Great Britain was built by Richard Thomas & Co. in the late 1930s. Strip mills rendered the old pack mills obsolete and the last of them closed in about the 1960s.

Pack mill process
The raw material was bar iron, or (from the introduction of mild steel in the late 19th century), a bar of steel.  This was drawn into a flat bar (known as a tin bar) at the ironworks or steel works where it was made.  The cross-section of the bar needed to be accurate in size as this would be the cross-section of the pack of plates made from it.  The bar was cut to the correct length (being the width of the plates) and heated.  It was then passed four or five times through the rolls of the rolling mill, to produce a thick plate about 30 inches long.  Between each pass the plate is passed over (or round) the rolls, and the gap between the rolls is narrowed by means of a screw.

This was then rolled until it had doubled in length.  The plate was then folded in half ('doubled') using a doubling shear, which was like a table where one half of the surface folds over on top of the other.  It is then put into a furnace to be heated until it is well 'soaked'.  This is repeated until there is a pack of 8 or 16 plates.  The pack is then allowed to cool.  When cool, the pack was sheared (using powered shears) and the plates separated by 'openers' (usually women).  Defective plates were discarded, and the rest passed to the pickling department.

In the pickling department, the plates were immersed in baths of acid (to remove scale, i.e., oxide), then in water (washing them).  After inspection they were placed in an annealing furnace, where they were heated for 10–14 hours.  This was known as 'black pickling' and 'black annealing'.  After being removed they were allowed to cool for up to 48 hours.  The plates were then rolled cold through highly polished rolls to remove any unevenness and give them a polished surface.  They were then annealed again (but at a lower temperature) and pickled again, this being known as 'white annealing' and 'white pickling'.  They were then washed and stored in slightly acid water (where they would not rust) awaiting tinning.

The tinning set consisted of two pots with molten tin (with flux on top) and a grease pot.  The flux dries the plate and prepares it for the tin to adhere.  The second tin pot (called the wash pot) had tin at a lower temperature.  This is followed by the grease pot (containing an oil), removing the excess tin.  Then follow cleaning and polishing processes.  Finally, the tinplates were packed in boxes of 112 sheets ready for sale.  Single plates were 14 inches by 20 inches; doubles twice that.  A box weighed approximately a hundredweight.

What is described here is the process as employed during the 20th century.  The process grew somewhat in complexity with the passage of time, as gradually it was found that the inclusion of additional procedures improved quality.  However the practice of hot rolling and then cold rolling evidently goes back to the early days, as the Knight family's tinplate works had (from its foundation in about 1740) two rolling mills, one at Bringewood (west of Ludlow) which made blackplate, and the other the tin mill at Mitton (now part of Stourport), evidently for the later stages.

Strip mill process
The strip mill was a major innovation, with the first being erected at Ashland, Kentucky in 1923.  This provided a continuous process, cutting out the need to pass the plates over the rolls and to double them.  At the end the strip was cut with a guillotine shear or rolled into a coil.  Early (hot rolling) strip mills did not produce strip suitable for tinplate, but in 1929 cold rolling began to be used to reduce the gauge further.  The first strip mill in Great Britain was opened at Ebbw Vale in 1938 with an annual output of 200,000 tons.

The strip mill had several advantages over pack mills: 
 It was cheaper due to having all parts of the process, starting with blast furnaces, on the same site.
 Softer steel could be used.
 Larger sheets could be produced at lower cost and this reduced cost and enabled tinplate and steel sheet to be used for more purposes.
 It was capital-intensive, rather than labour-intensive.

Further reading
 
 
 
 
 W. W. Minchinton, The British tinplate industry: a history (Oxford 1957).
 P. Jenkins, 'Twenty by Fourteen':  a history of the south Wales tinplate industry 1700-1961 (Gomer, Llandysul, Dyfed 1995).
D.A. Irwin, 'Did late nineteenth century U.S. tariffs promote infant industries? Evidence from the tinplate industry' (NBER working paper 6835 1998)

See also
Plating for other processes for plating metals.
Tinsmith
Tinware
 Terne plate, a cheaper version, but not food-safe, using a mixture of lead and tin.

Footnotes

Industrial processes
Thin film deposition
Metallurgy
Steelmaking
Metal plating
Coatings
Tin